Alex Antonitsch and Balázs Taróczy were the defending champions but lost in the semifinals to Jan Gunnarsson and Anders Järryd.

Gunnarsson and Järryd won in the final 6–2, 6–3 against Paul Annacone and Kelly Evernden.

Seeds

  Paul Annacone /  Kelly Evernden (final)
  Alex Antonitsch /  Balázs Taróczy (semifinals)
  Omar Camporese /  Diego Nargiso (quarterfinals)
  Jan Gunnarsson /  Anders Järryd (champions)

Draw

External links
 1989 CA-TennisTrophy Doubles draw

Doubles